is a mountain located between the towns of Tateyama and Kurobe in Toyama Prefecture, Japan. The mountain is primarily composed of granite and is part of the Hida Mountains, also known as the Northern Japan Alps. Mount Okukane, together with the Kurobe and Sarutobi gorges, were designated a Special Natural Monument and Special Place of Scenic Beauty in 1964.

Etymology

The mountain appears in maps beginning in the Edo period (1603 – 1868), the earliest being in 1648.

Recreation

The sheer face of Mount Okukane has become a popular destination for rock climbers. The mountain and the surrounding Kurobe Gorge are known for their fall colors, which have a long season from the middle of October to the middle of November. The  Okukane Bridge, a bright red pedestrian bridge which spans high over the Kurobe River, connects Keyakidaira Station to numerous hiking trails and two ryokan inns with onsen (hot springs).

Transportation

Mount Okukane is accessible from the Kurobe Gorge Railway. The railway was originally built for the construction of the Kurobe Dam, but is now used for tourism in the Kurobe Gorge area. The railway begins at Unazuki Station, a ten-minute walk from the Main Line Unazukionsen Station. The Okukane Bridge is directly adjacent to Keyakidaira Station, the terminus of the railroad.

Footnote

A.In Japanese: .

References

Mountains of Toyama Prefecture
Places of Scenic Beauty